Charles J. Hewitt (July 15, 1867 – July 22, 1940) was an American businessman, banker and politician from New York. He was the first politician to complete 30 years sitting in the New York State Senate.

Life
He was born on July 15, 1867, in Navarino, Onondaga County, New York, the son of Jefferson Smith Hewitt (1839–1894) and Melinda (Johnson) Hewitt (1845–1922). The family removed to a farm in Locke in 1870. He attended the graded school in Locke, and Moravia High School. He married Adina Hart (born 1869). He engaged in the produce business; and later also in the cold storage business. He was President of the Locke Citizens' Bank.

Hewitt was Supervisor of the Town of Locke in 1899 and 1900; and a member of the New York State Assembly (Cayuga Co., 2nd D.) in 1902, 1903 and 1904.

On October 5, 1908, he was nominated as a compromise candidate for the State Senate after a week of deadlock and the retirement of both previous candidates. Hewitt was a member of the New York State Senate from 1909 to 1938, sitting in the 132nd, 133rd, 134th, 135th, 136th, 137th, 138th, 139th, 140th, 141st, 142nd, 143rd, 144th, 145th, 146th, 147th, 148th, 149th, 150th, 151st, 152nd, 153rd, 154th, 155th, 156th, 157th, 158th, 159th, 160th and 161st New York State Legislatures; and was for many years Chairman of the Senate Committee on Finance.

He died suddenly on June 22, 1940, at his home in Locke, Cayuga County, New York; and was buried at the Indian Mound Cemetery in Moravia.

Sources

1867 births
1940 deaths
Republican Party New York (state) state senators
People from Moravia, New York
Republican Party members of the New York State Assembly
Town supervisors in New York (state)
People from Onondaga, New York